Sadie F McLellan (25 October 1914 - 7 February 2007), was a Scottish stained glass artist known for her work in Robin Chapel and Glasgow Cathedral.

Biography 
Born in Milngavie, Scotland on 25 October 1914, she was the youngest child of Elizabeth McLellan, née Hannah and John McLellan. McLellan was educated at Bearsden Academy before going on to graduate from the Glasgow School of Art with distinction. In her third year she studied in the workshop of Charles Baillie, an artist who worked with stained glass. She was awarded the John Keppie scholarship.

McLellan pioneered the use of a stained glass technique called "Dalle de verre" in Scotland. She used this technique in her work in Pluscarden Abbey.

From 1971 McLellan and her husband worked in the Crawfordjohn, South Lanarkshire and in 1989 McLellan retired to live with her daughter in Canada.

Notable works 
McLellan's work can be found in churches and buildings around Scotland including:

 Glasgow Cathedral
 Cambuslang Old Parish
 Netherlee, Alloa
Te Deum Laudmus in Kelvinside Hillhead Parish Church, Glasgow
 Cardonald churches,
 Pluscarden Abbey,
 Ten windows depicting scenes from John Bunyan’s Pilgrim’s Progress in the Robin Chapel of the Thistle Foundation
 Cardross Parish Church: Windows on the theme Recurrent Creation comprise four pairs of lights, illustrating the flow of creation through the seasons of the year.
 Pluscarden Abbey Marian window celebrates the Virgin Mary, and depicts the cosmic battle between good and evil.

Personal life 
In 1940, McLellan married Walter Pritchard, a fellow stained-glass artist and muralist. They had one daughter.  Her brother is Robert McLellan, Scottish dramatist.

In his book A Lap of Honour (1967), the author Hugh MacDiarmid dedicated the poem The Terrible Crystal "To Sadie MacLellan (Mrs Walter Pritchard)".  In this poem MacDiarmid praises "Clear thought" and "the open and unbiased mind".

External links 
 Crawfordjohn Heritage Venture

References 

1914 births
2007 deaths
Stained glass artists and manufacturers
Scottish artists